Aspidotis californica is a species of fern known by the common name California lacefern. It is native to California and Baja California.

It grows in rock cracks and crevices in many types of habitat, including Chaparral, Yellow pine forest, Foothill oak woodland, and Valley grassland.

Description
Aspidotis californica has leaves that are thin and dissected into many triangular leaflets which are subdivided into small segments with curled teeth.

The leaf segments bear sori containing sporangia, with the edges of the leaves rolled under to create a false indusium over the sori.

References

External links
Calflora Database: Aspidotis californica (California lace fern)
Jepson Manual eFlora (TJM2) treatment of Aspidotis californica
USDA Plants Profile for Aspidotis californica (California lace fern)
UC Photos gallery — Aspidotis californica

Pteridaceae
Ferns of California
Ferns of Mexico
Flora of Baja California
Flora of the Sierra Nevada (United States)
Natural history of the California chaparral and woodlands
Natural history of the California Coast Ranges
Natural history of the Channel Islands of California
Natural history of the Peninsular Ranges
Natural history of the Santa Monica Mountains
Natural history of the Transverse Ranges
Plants described in 1851